Labarre or LaBarre is a surname. Notable people with the surname include:

Éloi Labarre (1764–1833), French architect
Marie-Agnès Labarre (born 1945), French politician
Sheila LaBarre (born 1958), American murderer
Théodore Labarre (1805–1870), French harpist and composer